The second season of the NBC American supernatural drama series Grimm premiered on August 13, 2012, and consisted of 22 episodes. The series, created by David Greenwalt, Jim Kouf and Stephen Carpenter, follows a descendant of the Grimm line, Nick Burkhardt, as he deals with being a cop, and trying not to expose his secret as a Grimm.

Cast

Main cast
 David Giuntoli as Nick Burkhardt
 Russell Hornsby as Hank Griffin
 Bitsie Tulloch as Juliette Silverton
 Silas Weir Mitchell as Monroe
 Sasha Roiz as Captain Sean Renard
 Reggie Lee as Sergeant Drew Wu
 Bree Turner as Rosalee Calvert
 Claire Coffee as Adalind Schade (regular from episode 12 onwards, recurring previously)

Recurring cast
 Robert Blanche as Franco
 Danny Bruno as Bud Wurstner
 Christian Lagadec as Sebastien
 James Frain as Eric Renard
  Mary McDonald-Lewis as Frau Pech
 Sharon Sachs as Dr. Harper
 Shohreh Aghdashloo as Stefania Vaduva Popescu
 Michael Grant Terry as Ryan Smulson
 Bertila Damas as Pilar
 Reg E. Cathey as Baron Samedi
 Mary Elizabeth Mastrantonio as Kelly Burkhardt
 Jessica Tuck as Catherine Schade
 Lisa Vidal as Lauren Castro
 Mike Dopud as Marnassier
 Jim Crino as Leroy Estes
 Robert Alan Barnett as Matthew

Production
On March 16, 2012, NBC announced that the series had been renewed for a second season with a 22-episode order. Bree Turner, who plays Rosalee Calvert, joined the main cast from the beginning of season two. Production began on May 30 for an August 13 premiere. Claire Coffee, who plays Adalind Schade, was also upgraded to a series regular for season two, starting from episode 12.

The first four episodes debuted on Monday nights at 10 pm before moving back to Friday nights at 9 pm starting September 28. The fall finale aired on November 16. New episodes returned on March 8, 2013. The show was moved to Tuesday nights beginning with episode 19.

Russell Hornsby injured his Achilles tendon near the end of production of the second season. His character was written out as "on vacation" for two episodes (Volcanalis and Endangered) to give Hornsby time to undergo surgery.

Episodes

Ratings

DVD release

References

2012 American television seasons
2013 American television seasons
Season 2